The 1960 Uber Cup, held during the 1959-1960 badminton season, was the second edition of the women's international badminton championship. The ties (sets of matches) between zone winning nations took place in April 1960. Having won the previous tournament in 1957, the United States hosted the final round in Philadelphia.

In a repeat of the 1957 Uber Cup final, the United States were victorious over Denmark with Judy Devlin again victorious in all three of her matches.

Teams
As defending champion, United States skip through to the final.

Europe
 Denmark
 Ireland

Asia
 India
 Malaysia

Americas
 Canada
 United States

Australasia
 New Zealand
 Australia

Knockout stages

Qualifying round

First round

Second round

Final

References

 tangkis.tripod.com
 Mike's Badminton Populorum 

Uber Cup
Thomas & Uber Cup
Badminton tournaments in the United States